The Timor-Leste women's national under-17 football team is a national women's association football youth team of Timor Leste and is controlled by the Federação de Futebol de Timor-Leste (FFTL), represents Timor-Leste in international women's under-17 or under-17 tournament.

History
Their international debut came in October 2010 when they participated in the qualifying campaign for the 2011 AFC U-16 Women's Championship in China, with their opening match against Guam women's national under-16 football team ended with a 0-4 defeat. Given their history, it was no surprise that they crashed out with defeats against the likes of Guam, Vietnam, Philippines and Singapore.

Tournament Record

FIFA U-17 Women's World Cup record

AFC U-16 Women's Championship record

AFF U-16 Women's Championship record

Current staff
As of October 2010

List of Coaches

References

Asian women's national under-17 association football teams
women u17